Eric Lockwood (fourth ¼ 1932 – 27 February 2014) was an English professional rugby league footballer who played in the 1950s and 1960s.

Playing career

Genealogical information
Eric Lockwood was the youngest brother of Mavis Lockwood (birth registered during third ¼ 1924 in Wakefield district), Frank Lockwood (birth registered during second ¼ 1926 in Wakefield district), rugby league footballer Gerald Lockwood, and Ronald Lockwood (birth registered during second ¼ 1930 in Wakefield district). Eric Lockwood's marriage to Brenda (née Armitage) was registered during second ¼ 1956 in Lower Agbrigg district. They had children; Carl Lockwood (birth registered during second ¼  in Wakefield district), and Richard Lockwood (birth registered during fourth ¼  in Wakefield district). Carl Lockwood married Susan Davies, they have one child; Eleanor Lockwood, the only grandchild of Eric Lockwood.

References

External links

Search for "Lockwood" at rugbyleagueproject.org
(archived by archive.is) Eric Lockwood RIP (archive)

1932 births
2014 deaths
Doncaster R.L.F.C. players
English rugby league players
Rugby league players from Wakefield
Rugby league five-eighths
Rugby league fullbacks
Wakefield Trinity players